Waiting is an album by American jazz vibraphonist Bobby Hutcherson recorded in 1976 and released on the Blue Note label. The sessions were released on CD as part of Mosaic Select: Bobby Hutcherson in 2007.
The group is tight and well composed throughout the 6 original pieces, allowing Bobby to reach a free, rapidly changing score.

Reception 
The Allmusic review awarded the album 3½ stars.

Track listing 
All compositions by Bobby Hutcherson except as indicated
 "Waiting" (James Leary) - 7:07
 "Prime Thought" (Leary) - 7:14
 "Roses Poses" - 6:29
 "Don't Be Afraid (To Fall in Love Again)" (Leary) - 7:14
 "Searchin' the Trane" - 9:36
 "Hangin' Out (With You)" (Leary) - 4:25
Recorded at Different Fur Studios, San Francisco, California on February 24–26, 1976.

Personnel 
 Bobby Hutcherson - vibes, marimba
 Emanuel Boyd -  tenor saxophone, soprano saxophone, flute
 George Cables - piano
 James Leary III - bass
 Eddie Marshall - drums
 Kenneth Nash - percussion

References 

Blue Note Records albums
Bobby Hutcherson albums
1976 albums